The 1926 Cork Senior Hurling Championship was the 38th staging of the Cork Senior Hurling Championship since its establishment by the Cork County Board in 1887. The draw for the opening round fixtures took place on 2 March 1926. The championship began on 25 April 1926 and ended on 7 November 1926.

Blackrock were the defending champions.

On 7 November 1926, St. Finbarr's won the championship following a 6-02 to 5-04 defeat of Blackrock in the final. This was their eighth championship title overall and their first title in three championship seasons.

Team changes

To Championship

Promoted from the Cork Intermediate Hurling Championship
 Glen Rovers

From Championship

Regraded to the Cork Intermediate Hurling Championship
 Castletreasure

Results

First round

Second round

Semi-finals

Final

Statistics

Miscellaneous

 Glen Rovers make their first appearance in the senior championship.

References

Cork Senior Hurling Championship
Cork Senior Hurling Championship